Janet Beth Evans  (born August 28, 1971) is an American former competition swimmer who specialized in distance freestyle events.  Evans was a world champion and world record-holder, and won a total of four gold medals at the 1988 and the 1992 Olympics.

Biography
Born in Fullerton, California, Evans grew up in neighboring Placentia, where she started swimming competitively as a child.  By the age of 11, she was setting national age group records in distance events.  After swimming as a teenager for Fullerton Aquatics Sports Team (FAST Swimming) and graduating from El Dorado High School, Evans attended Stanford University, where she swam for the Stanford Cardinal swimming and diving team from 1989 to 1991.  She received the Honda Sports Award for Swimming and Diving, recognizing her as the outstanding college female swimmer of the year in 1988–89. When the NCAA placed weekly hours limits on athletic training time, she quit the Stanford swim team to focus on training.  She later attended the University of Texas at Austin before graduating from the University of Southern California with a bachelor's degree in communications in 1994.

Evans was distinctive for her unorthodox "windmill" stroke and her apparently inexhaustible cardio-respiratory reserves. Slight of build and short of stature, she more than once found herself competing and winning against bigger and stronger athletes, some of whom were subsequently found to have been using performance-enhancing drugs.

Janet Evans was the 1989 recipient of the James E. Sullivan Award as the top amateur athlete in the United States. She was named the Female World Swimmer of the Year by Swimming World Magazine in 1987, 1989, and 1990. In 1988, as a junior in high school, she was recognized as a "Rising Star" by the Los Angeles Times.

In 2010, Evans returned to competitive swimming in Masters swimming.

Evans married Bill Willson in 2004, with whom she has two children. As of June 2012, the family lives in Laguna Beach, California.

On November 3, 2016, Evans was chosen to serve as co-Grand Marshal of the 2017 Rose Parade.

As of August 2019, Evans works as chief athlete officer for the 2028 Summer Olympics organizing committee.

Career
In 1987, she broke the world records in the 400-meter, 800-meter, and 1,500-meter freestyle distances.  At the 1988 Summer Olympics in Seoul, South Korea, she won three individual gold medals, and she also earned the nickname "Miss Perpetual Motion".

In these Olympics, Evans set a new world record in the 400-meter freestyle event.  This record stood for 18 years until France's Laure Manaudou broke it in May 2006.

Evans held the 1,500-meter freestyle record, set in March 1988, through June 2007, when it was broken by American Kate Ziegler with her time of 15:42.54.

Evans held the world record in the 800-meter freestyle, 8:16:22, that she set in August 1989, until it was broken by Rebecca Adlington of Britain in August 2008.  Adlington set the new record with her time of 8:14.10 in winning the race at the 2008 Summer Olympics.  Evans's 800-meter record was one of the longest-standing ones ever in swimming, and it went unbroken through four Olympic Games (1992–2004).  Only the 100-meter freestyle swimming record set by the Dutch swimmer Willy den Ouden stood longer—from 1936 through 1956, during a period when international competition was interrupted by world war.

Following her outstanding performance of 1988, Evans continued to dominate the world's long-distance swimming competitions (400 meters and above).  Evans became the first woman to win back-to-back Olympic and world championship titles in any one swimming event by winning the 1988 and 1992 Olympic gold medals and the 1991 and 1994 world championships in the 800-meter freestyle race.  She would astonishingly go undefeated in all of the 400-, 800-, and 1500-meter freestyle events for over five years, only being broken with her shock defeat by Dagmar Hase in the 400-meter freestyle at the Barcelona Olympics, where she led for almost the entire race but was narrowly caught at the end.

Evans won the 400-meter and 800-meter freestyle events at the U.S. National Championships 12 times each, the largest number of national titles in one event by an American swimmer in the 100-year history of the competition.  At the 1992 Summer Olympics in Barcelona, however, she lost the 400-meter freestyle race to German swimmer Dagmar Hase, but she did win the 800-meter freestyle race later on.

Evans ended her swimming career, for all practical purposes, at the 1996 Summer Olympics in Atlanta, Georgia. She did not win any medals, but she did add one more highlight to her life.  She was given the honour of carrying the Olympic torch in the opening ceremony, and she handed the torch to the American boxing legend Muhammad Ali to light the cauldron. On July 27, 1996, she was in a building being interviewed by a German newsman when a bomb exploded nearby. The explosion very lightly shook the building and startled Evans.  The incident traumatised her so much that she had a panic attack the next day while waiting for a train in an Atlanta subway station.

In the swimming pool, Evans finished ninth in the preliminaries of the 400-meter freestyle.  She did not qualify for the finals, as only the top eight finishers advance to the next level.  In the final swim of her career, Evans finished in sixth place in the 800-meter freestyle.

At the Atlanta Games, American swimming officials criticized Ireland's Michelle Smith about her unexpected gold medals, suggesting that she might have been using performance-enhancing drugs.  When asked about the accusations, Evans said that when anyone like Smith showed such a significant improvement, "there's always that question."  American sportswriters sympathetic to Smith took this comment to mean that Evans was accusing Smith of steroid use as well, and they attacked Evans as being a sore loser.  Evans later insisted that she meant no such accusation and that her remarks were taken out of context.  In 1998, Smith received a four-year suspension for tampering with a urine sample.

At the end of Evans's swimming career, she held seven world records, five Olympic medals (including four gold medals), and 45 American national titles – third only to Tracy Caulkins and Michael Phelps.

In June 2011, it was reported that Evans was in the process of a comeback and had been training for six months with the goal of competing at the 2012 U.S. Olympic Trials. At the 2012 Olympic Trials, at the age of 40, she ended up finishing 80th out of 113 swimmers in the 400-meter freestyle and 53rd out of 65 swimmers in the 800-meter freestyle.

Evans was inducted into the International Swimming Hall of Fame as an "Honor Swimmer" in 2001.

Evans served as Vice Chair and Athletes director for the Los Angeles 2024 Olympic bid committee and traveled with the team to promote Los Angeles as a candidate city. Los Angeles was finally awarded the 2028 Summer Olympics at the 131st IOC Session in Lima, Peru, on September 13, 2017. As of 2020, Evans works with the organizing committee for the 2028 Summer Olympics in the executive leadership role of chief athlete officer.

See also
 List of members of the International Swimming Hall of Fame
 List of multiple Olympic gold medalists
 List of multiple Olympic gold medalists at a single Games
 List of Olympic medalists in swimming (women)
 List of Stanford University people
 List of University of Southern California people
 List of World Aquatics Championships medalists in swimming (women)
 World record progression 400 metres freestyle
 World record progression 800 metres freestyle
 World record progression 1500 metres freestyle

References

External links 
 
 Janet Evans (USA) – Honor Swimmer profile at International Swimming Hall of Fame 
 
 
 
 

1971 births
Living people
American female freestyle swimmers
American female medley swimmers
World record setters in swimming
James E. Sullivan Award recipients
Medalists at the FINA World Swimming Championships (25 m)
Olympic gold medalists for the United States in swimming
Olympic silver medalists for the United States in swimming
Sportspeople from Fullerton, California
Stanford Cardinal women's swimmers
Swimmers at the 1988 Summer Olympics
Swimmers at the 1992 Summer Olympics
Swimmers at the 1996 Summer Olympics
University of Southern California alumni
University of Texas at Austin alumni
World Aquatics Championships medalists in swimming
Medalists at the 1992 Summer Olympics
Medalists at the 1988 Summer Olympics